The Starlight Bowl is an amphitheater located in Balboa Park in San Diego, California. It was constructed for the 1935–1936 California Pacific International Exposition and seats 4,300. It was originally named the Ford Bowl because the automobile manufacturer sponsored outdoor concerts at the venue during the exposition by the Mormon Tabernacle Choir, the San Francisco Symphony, and other performers.

Civic Light Opera
Until 2011 Starlight Bowl was the outdoor home of the San Diego Civic Light Opera, also called Starlight Musical Theatre, which presented several Broadway musicals each summer. The Civic Light Opera company was founded in 1945. It was one of the oldest musical theatre companies in the United States.

The amphitheater sits almost directly under the landing path for San Diego International Airport. During musical performances the conductor had a set of lights that indicated the noise level from passing planes. When the noise reached a certain level the conductor signaled everyone to pause, and the musicians and performers froze in place until the plane passed. 

The San Diego Civic Light Opera struggled financially in recent years. In 2011 (which would have been the company's 65th season) no productions were mounted, and in August the company filed for Chapter 11 bankruptcy. In 2012 there were no productions, and the company's website was still live but was only advertising shows at other venues. As of 2016 the company's email no longer works and its Facebook page has been removed. The unused Starlight Bowl theater is falling into disrepair and has been described as an "attractive nuisance".

In October 2019, a group of thieves broke into the amphitheater and stole items such as signed guitars and computer equipment valued at $28,000.

Save Starlight

A non-profit called Save Starlight was founded in 2016 to restore the bowl. Their mission is to restore the bowl as a new platform for a multi media , multi cultural event space.

See also

 List of contemporary amphitheatres
 Culture of San Diego

References

External links

 San Diego Parks & Recreation Website

Amphitheaters in California
Balboa Park (San Diego)
Buildings and structures in San Diego
Musical theatre companies
World's fair architecture in California